Unionville is a city in Appanoose County, Iowa, United States. The population was 75 at the time of the 2020 census. It has a post office which is open two hours per day (11:45 AM through 1:45 PM) Monday through Saturday.

History
Unionville claims to be the oldest settlement in Appanoose County; the first settles arrived in 1843 and the first school was built in 1846. J. F. Stratton surveyed Unionville in 1848 on land "near the old dragoon trail, the Mormon trail".
Unionville was founded in 1849. The city's name most likely commemorates the federal union. Unionville was incorporated as a city in 1922.

Geography
Unionville is located at  (40.818515, -92.694443).

Demographics

2010 census
As of the census of 2010, there were 102 people, 49 households, and 29 families living in the city. The racial makeup of the city was 100.0% White. Hispanic or Latino of any race were 3.9% of the population.

There were 49 households, of which 26.5% had children under the age of 18 living with them, 46.9% were married couples living together, 8.2% had a female householder with no husband present, 4.1% had a male householder with no wife present, and 40.8% were non-families. 36.7% of all households were made up of individuals, and 12.3% had someone living alone who was 65 years of age or older. The average household size was 2.08 and the average family size was 2.66.

The median age in the city was 51.8 years. 17.6% of residents were under the age of 18; 7% were between the ages of 18 and 24; 18.6% were from 25 to 44; 40.2% were from 45 to 64; and 16.7% were 65 years of age or older. The gender makeup of the city was 49.0% male and 51.0% female.

2000 census
As of the census of 2000, there were 127 people, 50 households, and 38 families living in the city. The racial makeup of the city was 100.00% White.

There were 50 households, out of which 38.0% had children under the age of 18 living with them, 64.0% were married couples living together, 8.0% had a female householder with no husband present, and 24.0% were non-families. 24.0% of all households were made up of individuals, and 12.0% had someone living alone who was 65 years of age or older. The average household size was 2.54 and the average family size was 3.00.

In the city, the population was spread out, with 26.8% under the age of 18, 5.5% from 18 to 24, 24.4% from 25 to 44, 18.9% from 45 to 64, and 24.4% who were 65 years of age or older. The median age was 42 years. For every 100 females, there were 89.6 males. For every 100 females age 18 and over, there were 86.0 males.

The median income for a household in the city was $33,333, and the median income for a family was $44,375. Males had a median income of $26,250 versus $19,375 for females. The per capita income for the city was $13,856. There were 9.1% of families and 11.3% of the population living below the poverty line, including 22.2% of under eighteens and none of those over 64.

References

Cities in Appanoose County, Iowa
Cities in Iowa
1849 establishments in Iowa
Populated places established in 1849